Solanidine is a poisonous steroidal alkaloid chemical compound that occurs in plants of the family Solanaceae, such as potato and Solanum americanum. Human ingestion of solanidine also occurs via the consumption of the glycoalkaloids, α-solanine and α-chaconine, present in potatoes. The sugar portion of these glycoalkaloids hydrolyses in the body, leaving the solanidine portion. Solanidine occurs in the blood serum of normal healthy people who eat potato, and serum solanidine levels fall markedly once potato consumption ceases. Solanidine from food is also stored in the human body for prolonged periods of time, and it has been suggested that it could be released during times of metabolic stress with the potential for deleterious consequences. Solanidine is responsible for neuromuscular syndromes via cholinesterase inhibition.

Uses 
Solanidine is a very important precursor for the synthesis of hormones and some pharmacologically active compounds.

Synthetic uses

Solanidine to 16-DPA conversion

In 1994, Gunic and coworkers reported the electrochemical oxidation of 3β-acetoxy-solanidine in CH3CN/CH2Cl2 1/1 with pyridine as a base. The corresponding iminium salts 2 and 3 were obtained in a 1/1 ratio in good yield. Performing this electrochemical reaction in DCM with pyridine gives 3 in 95% yield, while the same reaction in acetone gives iminium salt 2 in 95% yield. Iminium ion 2 can be isomerized to the thermodynamically more stable enamine 5. THis isomerization is believed to proceed via enamine 4, which is the kinetic product.

In 1997, Gaši et al. reported a short procedure for the degradation of solanidine to 16-Dehydropregnenolone acetate. Instead of applying the electrochemical oxidation, Hg(OAc)2 in acetone was used as oxidizing agent. The advantage of this reagent and solvent system was the ease of use and the selective formation of iminium salt 2, which spontaneously isomerized to enamine 3 (94%). This enamine was then subjected to another isomerization, which yielded the more thermodynamically more stable enamine 4. NaIO4-oxidation opened up the cyclic enamine and gave lactam 5. Elimination of the lactam part with Al2O3 in benzene afforded in 34% 16-dehydropregnenolone acetate (DPA) (6). Using K2CO3 in benzene followed by reacetylation produced 6 in a lower yield (11%).

Solanidine to Tomatidenol conversion

In 1968, Beisler and Sato synthesized tomatidenol from solanidine, and reported the successful opening of the E ring of solanidine via the von Braun reaction. Only in case of acetylated solanidine the von Braun reaction gave the E ring-opened product in 78% yield.

Treatment of α-bromine with KOAc gave in good yield the β-diacetate, which could be reduced with Red-Al in benzene.

These types of compounds can be ringclosed to spirosolane compounds as shown by Schreiber.

See also
Solasodine

References 

Steroidal alkaloids
Plant toxins
Steroidal alkaloids found in Solanaceae
Heterocyclic compounds with 6 rings
Nitrogen heterocycles